Roscelin of Compiègne, better known by his Latinized name Roscellinus Compendiensis or Rucelinus, was a French philosopher and theologian, often regarded as the founder of nominalism.

Biography
Roscellinus was born in Compiègne, France. Little is known of his life, and knowledge of his doctrines is mainly derived from Anselm and Abelard.

He studied at Soissons and Reims, was afterwards attached to the cathedral of Chartres and became canon of Compiègne. As a monk of Compiègne, he was teaching as early as 1087. He had contact with Lanfranc, Anselm and St. Ivo of Chartres.

It seems most probable that Roscellinus was not strictly the first to promulgate nominalistic doctrines; but in his exposition they received more definite expression, and being applied to the dogma of the Trinity, attracted universal attention.

Roscellinus maintained that it is merely a habit of speech which prevents our speaking of the three persons as three substances or three Gods. If it were otherwise, and the three persons were really one substance or thing (una res), we should be forced to admit that the Father and the Holy Spirit became incarnate along with the Son. Roscellinus seems to have put forward this doctrine in perfect good faith, and to have claimed for it at first the authority of Lanfranc and Anselm.

In 1092/1093, however, a council convoked at Soissons by the archbishop of Reims condemned his interpretation, and Roscellinus, who was accused of tritheism, recanted the doctrines attributed to him, but only out of fear of excommunication and even stoning to death by the orthodox populace, for later he returned to his early theories. He fled to England, but having made himself unpopular by an attack on the doctrines of Anselm, he left the country and repaired to Rome, where he was well received and became reconciled to the Catholic Church. He then returned to France, taught at Tours and Loc-menach (Loches) in France (where he had Abelard as a pupil), and finally became canon of Besançon. He is heard of as late as 1121, when he came forward to oppose Abelard's views on the Trinity. He was also sent a letter by Theobald of Étampes for having denigrated wrongfully the sons of priests.

Of his writings there exists only a letter addressed to Abelard on the Trinity, in which Roscellinus "belittles Abélard and makes merry over his castration." Hauréau brings forward his name in connection with a text: "Sententia de universalibus secundum magistrum R." ("Notices et extr. de quelques manuscr. lat.", V, Paris, 1892, 224), but this is a conjecture. We have as evidences of his doctrine texts of Anselm, Abelard, John of Salisbury, and an anonymous epigram. His share in the history of ideas and especially his nominalism have been exaggerated, his celebrity being far more due to his theological tritheism.

Roscelin's nominalism, or Sententia Vocum
According to Otto of Freisingen Roscelin primus nostris temporibus sententiam vocum instituit (Gesta Friderici imp. in Monum. German. History: Script., XX, 376) (Literally: "was the first in our times to institute the opinion/theory of words"), but the chronicler of the "Historia Francia" (cf. Bouquet, "Recueil des hist. des Gaules et de la France", XII, Paris, 1781, 3, b, c) mentions before him a "magister Johannes", whose personality is much discussed and who has not yet been definitively identified. What constitutes the sententia vocum? To judge of it we have besides the texts mentioned above which bear directly on Roscelin an exposition of the treatise De generibus et speciebus (thirteenth century), wrongly attributed to Abelard by Victor Cousin. The "sententia vocum" was one of the anti-Realist solutions of the problem of universals accepted by the early Middle Ages. Resuming Porphyry's alternative (mox de generibus et speciebus illud quidem sive subsistent sive in nudis intellectibus posita sint) the first medieval philosophers regarded genera and species (substance, corporeity, animality, humanity) either as things or as having no existence, and applying to this alternative a terminology of Boethius, they derived thence either res (things) or voces (words). To the nominalists universals were voces 'voices', which means: (1) above all that universals are not res, that is that only the individual exists: nam cum habeat eorum sententia nihil esse praeter individuum ... (De gener. et spec., 524). Nominalism was essentially anti-Realist. (2) that universals are merely words, flatus vocis, e.g., the word "homo", divisible into syllables, consonants and vowels. Fuit autem, nemini magistri nostri Roscellini tam insana sententia ut nullam rem partibus constare vellet, sed sicut solis vocibus species, ita et partes ascridebat (Abelard, Liber divisionum, ed. Cousin, 471); "[...] Illi utique dialectici, qui non nisi flatum vocis putant universalis esse substantias, et qui colorem non aliud queunt intellegere quam corpus, nec sapientiam hominis aliud quam animam, prorsus a spiritualium quaestionum disputatione sunt exsufflandi." (Anselm, De Incarnatione Verbi, p. 285. Opera Omnia, vol. 1. Ed. F.S. Schmitt, 1938); "Alius ergo consistit in vocibus, licet haec opinio cum Roscelino suo fere omnino evanuerit (John of Salisbury, Metalog., II, 17). The universal is reduced to an emission of sound (flatus vocis), in conformity with Boethius' definition: Nihil enim aliud est prolatio (vocis) quam aeris plectro linguae percussio. Roscelin's universal corresponds to what is now called the "universale in voce" in opposition to universale in re and universale in intellectu.

But this theory of Roscelin's had no connection with the abstract concept of genus and species. He did not touch on this question. It is certain that he did not deny the existence or possibility of these concepts, and he was therefore not a nominalist in the fashion of Taine or in the sense in which nominalism is now understood. That is why, in reference to the modern sense of the word, some call it a pseudo-nominalism. John of Salisbury, speaking of "nominalis secta" (Metalog., II, 10), gives it quite another meaning. So Roscelin's rudimentary, even childish, solution does not compromise the value of universal concepts and may be called a stage in the development of moderate realism. However, because of his position as the first medieval philosopher to challenge medieval Realism, he has been invoked as a forefather of modernity.

Roscelin was also taken to task by Anselm and Abelard for the less clear idea which he gave of the whole and of composite substance. According to Anselm he maintained that colour does not exist independently of the horse which serves as its support and that the wisdom of the soul is not outside of the soul which is wise (De fide trinit., 2). He denies to the whole, such as house, man, real existence of its parts. The word alone had parts, ita divinam paginam pervertit, ut eo loco quo Dominus partem piscis assi comedisse partem hujus vocis, quae est piscis assi, non partem rei intelligere cogatur (Cousin, P. Abaelardi opera, II. 151).

Roscelin was not without his supporters; among them was his contemporary Raimbert of Lille, and what the monk Hériman relates of his doctrine agrees with the statements of the master of Compiègne. Universal substances, says Hériman, are but a breath, which means eos de sapientium numero merito esse exsufflandos. He merely comments on the saying of Anselm characterized by the same jesting tone: a spiritualium quaestionum disputatione sunt exsufflandi" (P.L., 256a), and says that to understand the windy loquacity of Raimbert of Lille one has but to breathe into his hand (manuque ori admota exsufflans "Mon. Germ. Hist.", XIV, 275).

Tritheism of Roscelin
Roscelin considered the three Divine Persons as three independent beings, like three angels; if usage permitted, he added, it might truly be said that there are three Gods. Otherwise, he continued, God the Father and God the Holy Ghost would have become incarnate with God the Son. To retain the appearance of dogma he admitted that the three Divine Persons had but one will and power [Audio ... quod Roscelinus clericus dicit in tres personas esse tres res ab invicem separatas, sicut sunt tres angeli, ita tamen ut una sit voluntas et potestas aut Patrem et Spiritum sanctum esse incarnatum; et tres deos vere posse dici si usus admitteret (letter of Anselm to Foulques)].

This characteristic tritheism, which Anselm and Abelard agreed in refuting even after its author's conversion, seems an indisputable application of Roscelin's anti-Realism. He even argues that if the three Divine Persons form but one God, all three have become incarnate. There are therefore three Divine substances, three Gods, as there are three angels, because each substance constitutes an individual, which is the fundamental assertion of anti-Realism. The ideas of the theologian are closely linked with those of the philosopher.

Notes

References

Citations

Bibliography

 .  & 

Philosophers of language
French philosophers
1050s births
1120s deaths
People from Compiègne
French male writers
11th-century French philosophers
11th-century French writers
11th-century Latin writers
12th-century French philosophers